The 1992–93 Boise State Broncos men's basketball team represented Boise State University during the 1992–93 NCAA Division I men's basketball season. The Broncos were led by tenth-year head coach Bobby Dye and played their home games on campus at the BSU Pavilion in Boise, Idaho.

tied for second in the standings. In the conference tournament at Moscow, Idaho, the second-seeded Broncos received a bye into the semifinals and defeated Weber State by  They met top-seeded host Idaho in the final and won by twelve.

The Broncos received the automatic bid to the NCAA tournament; no other Big Sky members were invited to the tournament or  Boise State was seeded fourteenth in the West regional and lost by twenty points in the first round to eighth-ranked Vanderbilt in  This was the eleventh consecutive year in which the Big Sky representative lost in the first round.

Postseason results

|-
!colspan=6 style=| Big Sky tournament

|-
!colspan=6 style=| NCAA tournament

References

External links
Sports Reference – Boise State Broncos – 1992–93 basketball season

Boise State Broncos men's basketball seasons
Boise State
Boise State
Boise State